Mark Watson Makes the World Substantially Better is a radio comedy programme starring Mark Watson. It started on BBC Radio 4 on 13 February 2007. The show is recorded in front of a live audience and has the format of stand-up comedy from Watson interspersed with songs and poetry.

Series 1
Each episode of the first series dealt with the problems of the world, characterised by the seven deadly sins. Tim Minchin provided music, and Tim Key provided poetry.
Episode 1 - Greed and Gluttony (the "similar sins")
Episode 2 - Lust
Episode 3 - Pride
Episode 4 - Envy
Episode 5 - Sloth
Episode 6 - Wrath

Series 2
The second series began on 13 August 2008, this time looking at the world's virtues. Tim Key again provided poems, but Tom Basden replaced Minchin as the musician.

Episode 1 - Courage
Episode 2 - Patience
Episode 3 - Generosity
Episode 4 - Honesty
Episode 5 - Diligence
Episode 6 - Humility

External links

BBC Radio comedy programmes
2007 radio programme debuts
BBC Radio 4 programmes